Martin Daniel (born 17 December 1956) is a Republican party member and formally a member of Tennessee's House of Representatives, representing District 18 of Knox County from 2014 until his retirement from government in 2020.

Education and Background

Education 
In 1982, Daniel went to University of Tennessee-Knoxville to study for his Master of Business Administration (MBA) in Business and Marketing. While there, he also earned a Bachelor's of Science degree in General Business. Martin Daniel also received a Juris Doctor at the University of Memphis in 1985.

Professional Experience 
Daniel is currently a business owner and manager of Elevation Outdoor Advertising, LLC as well as serving president of Defeat Duchenne, Inc.

Other past experiences include:

 Owner of Tennessee Outdoor Advertising, Inc. (1992-1998).
 Owner of Emerald Outdoor Advertising (1993-1997).
 Owner of Delta Outdoor Advertising (1998-2002).

Political Experience 
Daniel began his political career as a member of the Tennessee House of Representatives in 2014 and was re-elected in November 2018. Daniel barely won the victory in the 2018 election against Greg Mackay for seat in House of Representatives.

2018 Election 
In 2018, Daniel's re-election victory for the District 18 against Greg Mackay.

Current Committees

Honors and awards 
In 2017, Martin Daniel received both the "Guardian of Small Business" Award and Legislator of the Year, awarded by the Tennessee Community Organization.

Personal life 
Daniel was born in Memphis, Tennessee in 1956. He lives with his wife, Melissa, and their two children in Knoxville, Tennessee.

References 

1956 births
Tennessee Republicans
Living people
Politicians from Memphis, Tennessee
University of Tennessee alumni
University of Memphis alumni
21st-century American politicians